Malim may refer to

Places
Malim Jaya, a township in Batu Berendam, Malacca, Malaysia
Tanjung Malim, a town in the state of Perak, Malaysia
Malim Nawar, a small town in Perak, Malaysia
Malim, a barangay of Tabina, Zamboanga del Sur, Philippines

People
William Malim (1533–1594), English academic and author, head master of Eton College
Nigel Malim (1919–2006), Royal Navy officer

Other
Malim, an Empire ships coaster, formerly Empire Mayflower
Hikayat Malim Dewa, a Malay literary work